STX Entertainment is an American entertainment and media company. Founded in March 2014 by film producer Robert Simonds, the studio produces film, television, and digital media projects.

In April 2020, STX announced that it would merge with the Indian studio Eros International plc. The merger was completed in July 2020, and STX became a division of ErosSTX. In December 2021, Jahm Najafi announced his intention to acquire STX from the merged company for $173 million–a sale completed in April 2022. Eros remains a minority, non-voting shareholder.

History
In 2012, Simonds and McGlashan began work on conceptualizing a media company based on the idea of producing medium-budget projects with a star attached, a method that had gone out of style with Hollywood studios. The conversation led to the launch of STX Entertainment in 2014, with the mission to finance, develop, produce, market, and distribute star-driven content around the world. Investors in the company included Hony Capital, Tencent, PCCW, TPG Growth, and Liberty Global. Individual investors include Gigi Pritzker, Beau Wrigley, and Dominic Ng.

In September 2017, it was reported that STX was considering an initial public offering on the Hong Kong Stock Exchange (SEHK). It was reported that a listing on the SEHK could bring STX closer to Chinese investors and audiences. The Wall Street Journal stated that the company could be valued at $3.5 billion, after raising an additional $500 million following the IPO. In April 2018, the company filed for an IPO on the Hong Kong Stock Exchange.

STX called off its IPO in October 2018, citing the China–U.S. trade war, and conditions having deteriorated in Hong Kong due to turbulence in the mainland Chinese equity market.  An overall co-funding agreement with Chinese company Huayi Brothers Media lapsed at the end of 2018, and in April 2019, co-founder Bill McGlashan was fired due to his being indicted in the college admissions bribery scandal.

In April 2020, STX announced that it would merge with the Indian film and television studio Eros International plc. Simonds stated that the merger would create "the first independent media company with the expertise and creative cultures of Hollywood and Bollywood, while also leveraging the important inroads both companies have made into the Chinese market." The combined company would be publicly-traded, inheriting Eros' listing on the New York Stock Exchange. The merger was closed on July 30, 2020; the combined company unveiled a new logo and branding as ErosSTX in September. The combined entity raised $125 million of new equity funding and received $350 million in credit led by JPMorgan.

In December 2021, amid financial shortcomings following the merger, Jahm Najafi's Najafi Companies announced that it had reached an agreement to acquire STX Entertainment from ErosSTX for $173 million. However, in late January 2022, Lionsgate also emerged as a potential suitor, looking to absorb either part or whole of STX, but the deal was later rejected, leaving only Najafi as a potential suitor. In April 2022, Najafi Companies completed its acquisition of STX Entertainment. Eros Media World will retain a 15% non-voting stake in the company. In July 2022, shortly after STX's motion picture chairman Adam Fogelson departed for the studio, Deadline reported that STX was in talks with Lionsgate over a potential film distribution deal. Shortly after, it was reported that STX Entertainment's U.K. offices, including the London office housing STXinternational's headquarters, were gradually shutting down. Following the departure of STXinternational head John Friedberg to join Black Bear Pictures' international division, it was announced the latter company was nearing a deal with STX to handle part of its slate internationally. In November 2022, It was reported that STX's distribution and marketing operations would be shuttered and that Operation Fortune: Ruse de Guerre would go to a streaming service domestically, alternatives being considered for The Marsh King's Daughter, Lionsgate possibly taking over distribution for Enzo and Greenland: Migration being packaged to other distributors. By February of 2023, It was reported that Lionsgate had already took domestic rights from Operation Fortune: Ruse de Guerre with plans to release it theatrically on March 3, 2023.

STX Films

Distribution 
At launch, the film division of STX focused its efforts on creating a new model. Rather than pursuing the traditional distribution process, the company secured direct distribution agreements with North American theater chains AMC, Regal, Cinemark, Goodrich, Marcus Theatres, and Carmike Cinemas. In early 2015, the company signed a multiyear television output agreement to release films exclusively to Showtime Networks and its channels Showtime, The Movie Channel, and Flix during the premium television window. The deal covers STX Films theatrical releases through 2019. In April 2015, the company entered into a multiyear partnership with Universal Studios Home Entertainment for Universal to handle marketing, sales, and distribution services for Blu-ray, DVD, and VOD platforms for STX Films theatrical titles in North America. Film distribution was transferred to Studio Distribution Services, LLC., a joint venture between UPHE and Warner Bros. Home Entertainment. That same month, STX Films closed a three-year slate deal with Huayi Brothers, one of China's largest film studios, enabling the companies to co-produce and co-distribute 12 to 15 films annually. In January 2017, STX Films signed a marketing and distribution agreement with Luc Besson's EuropaCorp Films USA to release their upcoming slate of films in the US. In February 2018, STX Films announced it would distribute Netflix and Martin Scorsese's mob drama The Irishman in China along with Media Asia Entertainment Group.

In May 2018, it was reported that STX would distribute and oversee production on Tencent Pictures and Free Association's film adaptation of the digital comic book Zombie Brother, to be directed by David Sandberg. In July 2018, STX Films acquired domestic distribution rights to the civil rights drama The Best of Enemies; it stars Taraji P. Henson and Sam Rockwell, is directed by Robin Bissell, and was released on April 5, 2019.

Film projects 
In line with its mission to make medium-budget, star-driven content, STX Films projects have included Hustlers starring Jennifer Lopez and Constance Wu, I Feel Pretty starring Amy Schumer, Second Act, a romantic comedy starring Lopez and directed by Peter Segal, Bad Moms starring Mila Kunis, Kristen Bell and Christina Applegate; Molly's Game, written and directed by Aaron Sorkin and starring Jessica Chastain; The Gift, written, co-produced and directed by Joel Edgerton and starring Jason Bateman and Rebecca Hall; The Edge of Seventeen starring Hailee Steinfeld; The Foreigner starring Jackie Chan and Pierce Brosnan; Secret in Their Eyes starring Chiwetel Ejiofor, Nicole Kidman and Julia Roberts; The Boy starring Lauren Cohan; and Free State of Jones starring Matthew McConaughey. In 2015, STX Films acquired its first feature at the Toronto International Film Festival, purchasing the worldwide rights to the sci-fi, action adventure Hardcore Henry for US$10 million.

In 2017, STX Films announced its expansion into animation and family content with a partnership with the Uglydoll brand. The UglyDolls film was produced by Robert Rodriguez, director of the Spy Kids film franchise, and it features the voices of Pitbull, Kelly Clarkson, Nick Jonas, Blake Shelton, and Janelle Monáe. It performed poorly at the box office, and received a lot of bad reviews from the critics. In January 2019, it was reported that STX is planning an animated UglyDolls television series with Hulu.

In January 2018, STX Films and Tencent Pictures announced a co-development deal with Jason Statham targeting the Chinese film market. Statham starred in Furious 7 and The Fate of the Furious, China's two highest-grossing imported films ever. In February 2018, STX Films signed a deal with Alibaba Pictures to co-develop and co-produce the action-sci-fi film Steel Soldiers, produced by Robert Zemeckis. Under the deal, STX Films will handle US and international distribution with Alibaba Pictures retaining rights in Greater China.

In January 2019, STX Films had their first number one box office opening with The Upside, which stars Kevin Hart, Bryan Cranston and Nicole Kidman, and earned $19.59 million in its opening weekend, and went on to earn over $100 million at the domestic box office. STX earned praise for its efficient marketing of the film, and for trimming The Upside from an R to PG-13 rating to widen its audience. That month, it was reported that Hart is partnering with STX Films to produce and star in two comedies: a body switch comedy called Black Friday, and an untitled international romantic comedy.

Hustlers had its world premiere at the 2019 Toronto International Film Festival, and was theatrically released in the US on September 13, 2019. It grossed $105 million in the US and Canada, and $157.6 million worldwide. The Gentlemen, written, directed and produced by Guy Ritchie and starring Matthew McConaughey, was released theatrically in January 2020. It grossed $115.2 million at the box office worldwide. As of July 2020, upcoming STX films include Greenland starring Gerard Butler, Run Rabbit Run starring Elisabeth Moss, The Godmother starring Jennifer Lopez, Night Wolf starring Kevin Hart, and Muscle starring Vin Diesel.

Awards and recognition 
In 2016, STX Films became the fastest studio ever to hit $100 million at the domestic box office with the R-rated comedy Bad Moms. The film has earned more than US$180 million worldwide, was the first R-rated comedy since The Hangover to get an A on CinemaScore and was the most profitable film of the year (by net profit). The film also earned a People's Choice Award for Best Comedy. The 2017 American crime drama Molly's Game was nominated for an Academy Award for Best Adapted Screenplay along with BAFTA, WGA, and Golden Globe nominations. The Edge of Seventeen was nominated for an MTV Movie Award for Movie of the Year, a Directors Guild Award for Outstanding Achievement in a First-Time Feature and a Golden Globe Award for Hailee Steinfeld. On review aggregator website Rotten Tomatoes, the film has an approval rating of 95%.

Genre films have also received recognition. The psychological horror-thriller The Gift was nominated for a Directors Guild Award for Outstanding Achievement in a First-Time Feature and won a Sitges Film Festival and Fangoria Chainsaw Award. The Space Between Us starring Gary Oldman was nominated for Choice Sci-Fi Movie and Choice Sci-Fi Movie Actor at the 2017 Teen Choice Awards. The horror thriller The Bye Bye Man overperformed industry expectations with a US$13.5 million domestic opening weekend. The Foreigner, a co-production with Jackie Chan's Sparkle Roll Media, crossed $100 million in global box office revenue in October 2017. The film is one of the most successful U.S. and China co-productions, being classified as "a clear winner given that it cost just $35 million" and "a fine example of how a Chinese co-production can work."

In 2019, Hustlers earned Jennifer Lopez the Los Angeles Film Critics Association Award for Best Supporting Actress and award nominations including the Golden Globe Award for Best Supporting Actress, Screen Actors Guild Award for Outstanding Performance by a Female Actor in a Supporting Role, Critics' Choice Movie Award for Best Supporting Actress, and the Independent Spirit Award for Best Supporting Female.

STX Films strives for female diversity in front of and behind the camera. More than 20 films have featured women in leading roles or were directed by women.

STX Television 
The television division's first project was the 2014 drama-thriller State of Affairs, starring Katherine Heigl and Alfre Woodard. The 13-episode series was developed by STX TV (as it is stylized) and sold to NBC. In 2015, STX TV produced the NBC pilot Problem Child, based on the 1990 film of the same name.

In April 2016, STX TV expanded into unscripted and reality content, hiring veteran TV producer Jason Goldberg. A few months later, the variety show Number One Surprise launched, which was the first TV series created by a US-based company specifically for broadcast in China. The series premiere in November 2016 on Hunan TV, a Chinese TV station, along with digital platforms Mango TV and PPTV, was viewed nearly 300 million times, and by January 2017 it was the #1 show in China with over 1 billion views.

In May 2017, STX TV announced it had acquired the first TV project from Kevin Kwan, author of Crazy Rich Asians. In August 2018, Amazon Studios gave a script-to-series order for the untitled project, a globe-hopping drama set in Hong Kong, about a powerful family and their business empire. In July 2017, E! greenlit the reality series The Platinum Life, produced by STX TV and Tower 2 Productions. In November 2017, STX TV announced its first scripted show Valley of the Boom, a six-part docudrama series about the 1990s tech boom from showrunner and director Matthew Carnahan and executive producer Arianna Huffington. The show airs on NatGeo, with STX distributing in China. It premiered on January 13, 2019. STX Television produced season 23 of True Life, which aired on MTV in 2017. The company also produced the docuseries A Little Too Farr, following American country singer-songwriter Tyler Farr, which premiered on Verizon's go90 streaming service. In February 2018, Fox and STX TV announced that it is developing an unscripted series based on its film Bad Moms. In April 2018, Mother Media Group, founded by former Endemol Shine and 20th Century Fox executives, signed a first-look deal with STX TV. Under the pact, the companies will collaborate to create, produce and distribute unscripted and hybrid series.

In 2018, it was reported that Netflix gave a six-episode series order to STX TV's hybrid docudrama miniseries Ottoman Rising, which tells the story of Mehmed the Conqueror; later retitled Rise of Empires: Ottoman, it premiered on Netflix on January 24, 2020. It was also announced that YouTube Red will produce a TV spinoff based on STX's 2016 film The Edge of Seventeen, with an entirely new cast.

STX Alternative 
The digital division of STX Entertainment focuses on digital programming, partnerships and distribution, which includes live events and virtual reality (VR). In August 2016, STX acquired the VR creator and distributor Surreal, renaming it STX Surreal. In its first year (2015), Surreal produced over 70 immersive VR experiences featuring Gordon Ramsay, Snoop Dogg, Jon Hamm, Jimmy Kimmel, Wolfgang Puck and Wiz Khalifa among others.

In 2017, STX Surreal was nominated for an interactive Daytime Emmy Award for the Nickelodeon short Nickelodeon's Ultimate Halloween Haunted House 360 Challenge and won a Shorty Award for Best Use of 360 Video for their 360° production of the 68th Emmy Awards, in collaboration with the Academy of Television Arts & Sciences and Facebook. In June 2017, STX Surreal announced a partnership with media services agency Horizon Media to develop and produce VR and immersive content for the brand's new UNCVR unit. In 2018, STX Surreal announced a slate of original projects including New Tricks, directed and produced by Ed Helms; The Kiev Exchange, a spin-off of STX Films' Mile 22; Jay and Silent Bob VR, written, produced, and directed by Kevin Smith; and untitled projects from Dave Bautista and Derek Kolstad.

Robert Rodriguez's live-action short-form VR film The Limit, starring Michelle Rodriguez, was released by STX Surreal on major mobile headsets and on Android phones with cardboard viewers in November 2018. It is also going to be released on iOS, PlayStation VR, and Windows Mixed Reality. The Academy Award-winning visual effects studio DNEG worked on the film in post-production.

In December 2017, Dick Clark Productions sold Chinese distribution rights to the Golden Globe Awards and Dick Clark's New Year's Rockin' Eve to STX Digital. STX partnered with Tencent Video to be its distribution partner for both programs, including the production of a Chinese-language red carpet program for the Chinese feed of the Golden Globes.

In December 2018, it was reported that the renamed division, now called STX Alternative, signed a first-look development and production deal with Tracey Edmonds, to co-produce and co-develop scripted and unscripted content for traditional and alternative platforms. The first project, Games People Play, based on the book Games Divas Play by Angela Burt-Murray, premiered on BET on April 23, 2019.

STX International 
In April 2016, a dedicated international division opened to further expand global production and distribution capabilities; it was called STX International. Headquartered in London, the division is led by former Film4 head David Kosse. The division launched with a slate of six films that included Andy Serkis's directorial debut Breathe (which opened the 2017 London Film Festival), Home Again starring Reese Witherspoon, and the thriller Wind River starring Jeremy Renner and Elizabeth Olsen. Additional titles on the slate include Ridley Scott's All the Money in the World, Neil Burger's thriller The Marsh King's Daughter and Bart Layton's heist film American Animals, along with titles from the main STX Films slate. STX bought the international distribution rights to The Irishman for $50 million. Renamed ErosSTX International following the merger of Eros International and STX in 2020, the company reverted back to its former name in April 2022 following STX's sale to Najafi Companies.

Film library

Film

Television and digital

References

External links
 

STX Entertainment
American film studios
American companies established in 2014
Film production companies of the United States
Entertainment companies based in California
Companies based in Los Angeles
Entertainment companies established in 2014
2014 establishments in California
Film distributors of the United States
2020 mergers and acquisitions
2022 mergers and acquisitions
International sales agents